Nantes station (French: Gare de Nantes) is the principal passenger railway station serving the French city of Nantes. It is a through station aligned east–west, with entrances and station facilities on both north and south sides. The two entrances are often described as Gare Nord and Gare Sud, as if they were separate stations, but they are in fact linked to each other and to all the platforms by a pedestrian subway. In 2020, after 3 years of work, a new pedestrian aerial way has been built over the railways to facilitate the passengers flow.

Construction was started on the current station in 1965, and it was placed into service three years later. It is situated somewhat to the east of the old Gare d'Orléans, originally the Nantes station of the Chemin de Fer de Paris à Orléans, which it replaced. The southern entrance hall was opened in 1989, in time for the inauguration of the TGV Atlantique. Since years, major changes has started to extend the station capacities and ease the users journey. The first major step was done in 2020 with the addition of the new aerial way, part of a more global transformation project which should end in 2025, with a complete restructuration of the station area.

Line 1 of the Tramway de Nantes serves the northern hall of the station. The southern hall is served by several of the bus services of the Tan network, including the Navette Tan Air express shuttle service to Nantes Atlantique Airport. All platforms at train station Nantes have elevators and escalators to help people with limited mobility.

Train services
The station is served by the following service(s):

High speed services 
High speed services (TGV) Nantes - Angers - Le Mans - Paris
High speed services (TGV) Le Croisic - Saint-Nazaire - Nantes - Paris
High speed services (TGV) Nantes - Le Mans - Massy - Lyon - Marseille / Montpellier
High speed services (TGV) Nantes - Le Mans - Massy - Strasbourg / Lille

Intercity and regional services 
Intercity services (Intercités) Nantes - La Rochelle - Bordeaux
Intercity services (Intercités) Nantes - Tours - Bourges - Lyon
Regional services (TER Bretagne) Quimper - Lorient - Vannes - Redon - Nantes
Regional services (Interloire) Le Croisic - Saint-Nazaire - Nantes - Angers - Saint-Pierre-des-Corps - Orleans
Regional services (TER Pays de la Loire) Rennes - Nantes
Regional services (TER Pays de la Loire) Redon - Nantes
Regional services (TER Pays de la Loire) Le Croisic - Saint-Nazaire - Nantes
Regional services (TER Pays de la Loire) Nantes - Angers - Le Mans
Regional services (TER Pays de la Loire) Nantes - Ancenis
Regional services (TER Pays de la Loire) Nantes - Clisson - La Roche-sur-Yon - Les Sables-d'Olonne
Regional services (TER Pays de la Loire) Nantes - Sainte-Pazanne - Pornic
Regional services (TER Pays de la Loire) Nantes - Sainte-Pazanne - Saint-Gilles-Croix-de-Vie

Local services 
Tram - Train services (TER Pays de la Loire) Nantes - Clisson - Cholet
Tram - Train services (TER Pays de la Loire) Nantes - La Chapelle - Châteaubriant

References

External links

Transport in Nantes
Railway stations in Loire-Atlantique
Nantes
Railway stations in France opened in 1968